2016 Shenzhen Open – Doubles may refer to:

2016 ATP Shenzhen Open – Doubles
2016 WTA Shenzhen Open – Doubles

See also 

2016 Shenzhen Open (disambiguation)